Mega Man X8, known as  in Japan, is a video game developed by Capcom for the Sony PlayStation 2 console. It is the eighth and, to date, final game in the Mega Man X series (excluding spin-offs and remakes). It was first released in North America on December 7, 2004. The PS2 version, as well as a Microsoft Windows iteration, were released in Japan and Europe the following year. On December 16 2015, it was released on PlayStation Network in Japan. It was released for Windows via Steam, PlayStation 4, Xbox One, and Nintendo Switch in July 24, 2018 worldwide and July 26, 2018 in Japan as a part of Mega Man X Legacy Collection 2 (Rockman X Anniversary Collection 2 in Japan).

The plot of Mega Man X8 focuses on the abduction of a next-generation "Reploid" from the construction site of a space elevator, and the subsequent pursuit of his captors. During the course of game play the motivations of these captors comes into focus, and it is up to the heroes, led by Mega Man X, to stop them. The gameplay of Mega Man X8 is similar to the other games in the series, in which the player must complete a series of stages. Defeating their bosses will earn that player character its special weapon.

Although Mega Man X8 uses 3D graphics like Mega Man X7, the development team chose not to opt for 3D gameplay, instead opting for 2.5D gameplay.  The game was met with a positive critical reception.

Plot

The story is set during the late 21XX. The Reploid rebellions across the past years continue, seemingly with no possible solution. To escape these troubles, mankind has begun the next generation of research and development by constructing an orbital elevator able to take equipment and handwork to the moon which they seek to colonize. This operation is labeled as the "Jakob Project", with the orbital elevator bearing its name, and a Reploid named Lumine is placed in charge of the project. As another part of the project, an advanced generation of Reploids is dispatched to the moon surface in order to work on the project. These New Generation Reploids are able to use DNA data to change their shapes. They are the perfect workers because they can change their shape according to a task, and have subroutines built in to prevent them from going Maverick.  (In Mega Man X7, it was revealed that Axl is the first of his kind, a prototype next-generation Reploid.)

Everything seems to be running smoothly until Vile, who has apparently been resurrected from his earlier defeat in Mega Man X3, kidnaps Lumine for unknown reasons. It becomes the Maverick Hunters' mission to rescue him. However, what the Hunters do not know is that Sigma has returned. Contained on every single copy chip in these robots is Sigma's own DNA, meaning that the next-generation 'Maverick-Proof' reploids are in fact able to go Maverick.  Sigma seeks to remove the "old generation" and repopulate it with his "children". When Sigma is defeated in his palace, Lumine steps in to take the entire operation over and kill the Maverick Hunters. Lumine gloats to the Hunters that, in order for evolution to take its course, he and his fellow new-generation Reploids must destroy both humans and "obsolete" Reploids. After a massive struggle, Lumine is defeated. When Axl walks up to Lumine's body, however, he is shocked as a tentacle springs from it and damages the crystal on his head. As the three different characters ride back down the Jakob Elevator, Zero wonders if he no longer has to fight now that Sigma is dead for good, while X ponders Lumine's words on evolution. Axl is unconscious, but his shattered crystal can be seen glowing with a tiny fragment of a crystal shard.

Gameplay

Overall gameplay in Mega Man X8 is mostly similar to previous Mega Man X games and has removed the 3D style from Mega Man X7 in favor of a 2.5D style, although 2 of the stages, namely "Central White" and "Dynasty", are fully 3D. After an introductory stage, Mega Man X8 presents the player with a choice of 8 stages, with a Maverick robot serving as the stage boss. After defeating the 8 bosses, a series of fortress stages open up for the player to complete in linear progression until the final boss is defeated.

The player starts the game with access to three playable characters: X, a shooter able to wear multiple armors that can be found hidden in the stages; Axl, a shooter able to transform into enemies; and Zero, a sword fighter able to double jump. Additionally, Zero can equip additional weapons that can be purchased at the store such as hammers and additional swords after finding a certain Rare Force Metal for it, excluding one of the weapons which is only available for purchase upon completing the game with Zero or entering the code in the title screen of the PlayStation 2 version. X8 introduces new mechanics to the game; the first is Guard Break, which can break enemy defenses when enemies are attacked with certain weapons. The second is Double Attack, where the playable character and the chosen partner character perform a screen-filling attack that causes heavy damage to all enemies on screen. Additionally, X's new armor, the Neutral Armor, can be customized with parts that can either form two new armors, or mixed together for different effects. However, mixed parts of armors are not as effective as complete armors, forcing players to choose wisely when building armors.

Two characters can be selected to go to a stage, while a navigator can be assigned to assist the player. Depending on the navigator's qualities, the character will be informed about the stages' hidden paths or boss weaknesses. In every stage, the characters can obtain items that can be used in a shop to buy upgrades. The three navigators can also be unlocked as the playable characters by buying chips after completing the game in the Normal or Hard levels or entering the code in the title screen of the PlayStation 2 version.

Development
Mega Man X8 was developed by Capcom Production Studio 1. The game's direct predecessor, Mega Man X7, was the first entry in the Mega Man X series to feature full 3D graphics, as well as 3D gameplay. However, as stated by Capcom producer and original Mega Man illustrator Keiji Inafune, the development team chose not to pursue 3D gameplay for Mega Man X8 simply because of its graphical style. Inafune himself was not involved in the production of Mega Man X8, although the game's art designers did consult with him before changing the overall style of the characters. The game's main illustrator, Tatsuya Yoshikawa, was responsible for designing the protagonists, the Maverick bosses, and the newer ancillary cast. Yoshikawa took into account what the characters may resemble if they were toys, and even imitated the joints of Revoltech figures.

The musical score for Mega Man X8 was co-composed by Yuko Komiyama, Naoto Tanaka, and Shinya Okada. The 51-song Rockman X8 Original Soundtrack was released in Japan on April 13, 2005 by Suleputer. The Japanese opening theme for PlayStation 2 (also available for PC platform in any regional version, including Europe which had received the North American opening theme in the European PlayStation 2 version) is "Wild Fang" by Janne Da Arc; the band had previously done television advertisement themes for Mega Man Battle Network and Mega Man Battle Network 2. However, the theme was not included in the soundtrack and was even omitted on the game's localization in English for PS2 platform.

A Windows version of Mega Man X8 was released in Asia, Europe, and as a download from GameStop in North America. This version can run in windowed mode, in addition to full screen, and includes mouse and keyboard features, although it does support using a controller. The Windows version also features several languages and the possibility to toggle between Japanese and English voices, which can be changed from the main menu or after starting a new game. All of the music and cutscene dialogue is encoded in Ogg Vorbis format.

Reception

Mega Man X8 received a generally mixed to positive reception. It was generally praised for returning to a more classic style of Mega Man gameplay and removing the criticized gameplay elements of Mega Man X7. IGN praised the game for its mixture of 2D and 3D, and its camera system, saying "Thankfully the transition from one plane to another is pretty seamless and isn't the bothersome chore that switches in X7 were. It's an easy and totally acceptable gameplay method and one that should have been used in 2003 to begin with." On the other hand, GameSpot criticized the game for its level design, which often made the game extremely frustrating to play. They also derided the story, remarking that it "dabbles in a lot of nonsensical anime-style ramblings about things that are of little importance to the actual game."

According to Famitsu, Mega Man X8 was the tenth best-selling game in Japan during its week of release at 14,927 units. A total of 35,546 units were sold in the region by the end of 2005.

References

 http://www.jp.playstation.com/software/title/jp0102npjd00115_000000000000000000.html

External links

Official website 

2004 video games
Mega Man X games
PlayStation 2 games
Superhero video games
Video game sequels
Video games developed in Japan
Video games with 2.5D graphics
Video games with cel-shaded animation
Windows games
PlayStation Network games